Charu Majumdar (Bengali: চারু মজুমদার; 15 May 1918 – 28 July 1972), popularly known as CM, was a Communist leader from India, and founder and General Secretary of the Communist Party of India (Marxist-Leninist). Born into a progressive landlord family in Siliguri in 1918, he became a Communist during the Indian Independence Movement, and later formed the militant Naxalite cause. During this period, he authored the historic accounts of the 1967 Naxalbari uprising. His writings, particularly the Historic Eight Documents, have become part of the ideology which guides the insurgencies.

Biography 
Majumdar was born in 1918 in Matualaloi, Rajshahi (now Siliguri) to the Zamindar family. His father was a freedom fighter during the Indian independence movement. Majumdar dropped out of college in 1938.

After dropping out, Majumdar joined the then banned Communist Party of India (CPI) to work in its peasant front. Soon an arrest warrant forced him to go underground for the first time as a communist activist. Although the CPI was banned at the outbreak of World War II, he continued CPI activities among peasants and was made a member of the CPI Jalpaiguri district committee in 1942. The promotion emboldened him to organize a 'seizure of crops' campaign in Jalpaiguri during the Great Famine of 1943. In 1946, he joined the Tebhaga movement in the Jalpaiguri region and embarked on a proletariat militant struggle in North Bengal. The stir shaped his vision of a revolutionary struggle. Later he worked among tea garden workers in Darjeeling.

The CPI was banned in 1948 and he spent the next three years in jail. In January 1952 he married Lila Mazumdar Sengupta, a fellow CPI member from Jalpaiguri. The couple moved to Siliguri, which was the center of Majumdar's activities for a few years. He was briefly imprisoned in 1962.

During the mid-1960s Majumdar organized a leftist faction in Communist Party of India (Marxist) (CPI(M)) in northern Bengal. In 1967, a militant peasant uprising took place in Naxalbari, led by his comrade-in-arms Kanu Sanyal. This group would later be known as the Naxalites, and eight articles written by him at this time—known as the Historic Eight Documents—have been seen as providing their ideological foundation: arguing that revolution must take the path of armed struggle on the pattern of the Chinese revolution. When the Naxalbari uprising was crushed in 1967, Majumdar said: "...hundreds of Naxalbaris are smoldering in India....Naxalbari has not died and will not die"The same year, Majumdar broke away and formed the All India Coordination Committee of Communist Revolutionaries which in 1969 founded the Communist Party of India (Marxist–Leninist)—with Majumdar as its General Secretary.

Death
He was captured in a state of bad health at his hideout on 16 July 1972 at 3 AM by an officer of Calcutta Police, Ranjit Guha Niyogi (alias Runu Guha Niyogi) and his team. As per the police, Majumdar died of a massive heart attack at 4 AM on 28 July 1972. But all the fractions of Naxalaites opine that it was a custodial murder and he was killed by not providing medicine in the police lock up. His body was cremated at Keoratola crematorium under the surveillance of armed police and paramilitary forces.

The radical leftist movement in India has seen many ideological splits since Majumdar's death. The Communist Party of India (Marxist-Leninist) Liberation observes Martyrs day in the day of Majumdar's death. The Communist Party of India (Maoist) observes Martyrs Week in the last week of July in remembrance of Majumdar's death, where members revisit his ideology and memorialise his influence on their movement.

Books on Charu Majumdar's life 

 Charu Majumdar: The Dreamer Rebel, written by Ashoke Mukhopadhyay, published by Niyogi Books in June 2022. 
 India after Naxalbari: unfinished history, written by Bernard D'Mello, published by Monthly Review Press New York in 2018.

References

External links
 Charu Majumdar Archives
 Is there a Charu Mazumdar Thought?

1916 births
1972 deaths
Indian communists
Indian revolutionaries
Stalinism
Maoist theorists
Anti-revisionists
Prisoners and detainees of British India
People from Siliguri
Deaths in police custody in India
20th-century Indian politicians
Bengali politicians
Pabna Edward College alumni
Communist Party of India (Marxist–Leninist) politicians
Indian people who died in prison custody
University of North Bengal alumni